Extreme Cuisine with Jeff Corwin is a television show where host Jeff Corwin travels to various parts of the world and samples diverse, local foods and learns about the various methods of preparation and attainment of foods.

References

External links

Extreme Cuisine with Jeff Corwin on FoodNetwork.com

2000s American cooking television series
2009 American television series debuts
2010 American television series endings
Food Network original programming
2010s American cooking television series